Moorebank was an electoral district of the Legislative Assembly in the Australian State of New South Wales from 1991, replacing Macquarie Fields and named after the suburb of Moorebank. In 1999, it was replaced by Macquarie Fields. Its only member was Craig Knowles, representing the Labor Party.

Members for Moorebank

Election results

1995

1991

References

Former electoral districts of New South Wales
Constituencies established in 1991
1991 establishments in Australia
Constituencies disestablished in 1999
1999 disestablishments in Australia